Linwood Earl Briley, James Dyral Briley Jr., and Anthony Ray Briley were a sibling trio of serial/spree killers, rapists, and robbers who were responsible for a murder and robbery spree that took place in Richmond, Virginia, in 1979.

Linwood murdered a woman in 1971 and served a year in a reformatory. In 1979, the three siblings (with help from an accomplice, Duncan Eric Meekins) went on a killing spree in their home city of Richmond, killing at least eleven people. Two would-be victims escaped unharmed. Linwood and James were sentenced to death. In 1984, the two elder brothers escaped death row with four other inmates but were recaptured within three weeks. Linwood and James were executed by electric chair in 1984 and 1985, respectively. Anthony Briley and Duncan Meekins are both still incarcerated.

Early lives
The three Briley brothers, Linwood Earl (March 26, 1954 – October 12, 1984), James Dyral Jr. (June 6, 1956 – April 18, 1985) and Anthony Ray (born February 17, 1958) were brought up by their parents, James Dyral Briley Sr. and Bertha, in Richmond's Highland Park neighborhood. Their oldest brother, Edward Jerome "Boot" (July 7, 1952 – November 19, 2020) left the home to live with relatives in North Carolina in his early teen years and was not involved with his younger brothers later criminal activities. 
With their younger brother Anthony, Linwood and James were regarded by older neighbors as young people who would help them repair cars or mow lawns. The brothers collected exotic pets, such as tarantulas, piranhas, and boa constrictors. When the brothers reached their teenage years, Bertha and James split up and she moved away. James Dyral Briley Sr., reportedly the only person the brothers respected, kept his bedroom door padlocked from the inside overnight.

First murder
On January 28, 1971, the first killing was committed by Linwood, at 16. While alone at home, Linwood fatally shot Orline Christian, a 57-year old neighbor, with a rifle from his bedroom window as she was hanging out some laundry on a clothesline. The crime almost went unidentified, but her relatives noticed a small bloody mark under her armpit at the viewing and asked a funeral director to re-examine the body. Upon a second examination, a small caliber bullet wound was discovered under her armpit.

Standing in Christian's back yard, a detective used a sheet of plywood to represent her body, with a hole cut out to represent the wound. He determined that the bullet came from the Briley residence. There, the murder weapon was found and Linwood admitted to the crime by saying, "I heard she had heart problems, she would have died soon anyway." After his lawyer convinced the judge that the shooting had been an accident, Linwood was sent to reform school to serve a one-year sentence for the killing. James followed in his path, and at a similar age was sentenced to time in juvenile hall for firing upon a police officer during a pursuit.

Murder spree
In 1979, the three Briley brothers and an accomplice, Duncan Eric Meekins, began the seven-month series of random killings that terrified the city and surrounding region.

Their first attack occurred on March 12, 1979, when Linwood knocked on the door of Henrico County couple William and Virginia Bucher. Claiming that he had car trouble and needed to use their telephone, Linwood eventually forced his way into their home. He held the couple at gunpoint and waved Anthony inside. The two Brileys tied up the couple and robbed the house, dousing each room with kerosene after stripping it of valuables. As they left, a lit match was tossed on the fuel. The two hurriedly packed their stolen loot – a television, CB radio, a .32 pistol, and jewelry – into their trunk and drove out of the area. William Bucher managed to free himself and his wife from their restraints, which Meekins apparently had not tied tightly enough, and escape just before the house became engulfed in flames. They would be the sole survivors of the rampage, although their cat perished in the blaze.

On March 21, Michael McDuffie, a vending machine serviceman, was assaulted, shot, and robbed in his suburban home by the Brileys.

Ten days later, on March 31, Linwood shot and killed 28-year old Edric Alvin Clark over a drug dispute involving Meekins.

On April 9, the brothers followed 76-year-old Mary Gowen across town from her babysitting job. They followed her into her house, beat, raped, robbed, and shot her. They escaped from the residence with many of her valuables.

The gang saw seventeen-year-old Christopher Philips hanging around Linwood's parked car on July 4. Suspecting that he might have been trying to steal the vehicle, the gang surrounded him and dragged him into a nearby backyard. There, the three brothers wrestled him to the ground. When Philips screamed for help, Linwood killed him by dropping a cinderblock onto his skull.

On September 14, disc jockey John Harvey "Johnny G." Gallaher was performing with his band at a South Richmond nightclub. Stepping outside between sets for a break, he inadvertently came right into the hands of the Brileys. Having been looking around town for a victim all night without success, they decided to lie in wait for whoever might happen to step outside. Gallaher was assaulted by Linwood and put into the trunk of his own Lincoln Continental. He was then driven out to the ruins of a paper mill on Mayo Island, located in the middle of the James River, where he was removed from the trunk of his car and shot dead at point blank range in the head. Six dollars were taken from his wallet and divided up. Gallaher's body was then dumped into the river. The remains were found two days later. When arrested months later, Linwood was still wearing a ring stolen from Gallaher's hand.

On September 30, 62-year-old private nurse Mary Wilfong was followed home to her Richmond apartment. The brothers surrounded her just outside the door and Linwood beat her to death with a baseball bat. The brothers then entered her apartment and robbed it of valuables.

Five days later, on October 5, just two blocks from the Briley home on 4th Avenue, 75-year-old Blanche Page and her 59-year-old boarder Charles Garner were murdered by the brothers. Page was bludgeoned to death while Garner was fatally assaulted and stabbed to death with various weapons, which included a baseball bat, five knives, a pair of scissors, and a fork. The scissors and fork were left embedded in Garner's back.

The victims of the final murders were the family of Harvey Wilkerson, a longtime friend of the brothers. On the morning of October 19, despite having promised a judge earlier that day that he would stay out of trouble while out on parole, James led his brothers on the prowl that night for yet another victim. Upon seeing the brothers down the street, Wilkerson, who lived with his 23-year-old common-law wife Judy Diane Barton (who was eight months pregnant at the time) and her 5-year-old son Harvey Wayne Barton, instinctively closed and locked his door. This action was noticed by the brothers, who then walked over to Wilkerson's front door. Terrified by their potential response if he refused them entry, Wilkerson allowed them in.

Both adults in the home were overpowered, bound and gagged with duct tape. Linwood then assaulted Judy Barton in the kitchen, where she was raped within hearing distance of the others. Meekins continued the sexual assault, after which Linwood dragged Barton back into the living room, briefly rummaged in the premises for valuables, and then left the house. The three remaining gang members covered their victims with sheets. James told Meekins, "you've got to get one", upon which Meekins took a pistol and fatally shot Wilkerson in the head. James then shot Barton to death. Harvey followed shortly.

Police happened to be in the general vicinity of the neighborhood, and later saw the gang members running down the street at high speed. They did not know where the shots had been fired. The bodies were not discovered until three days later, but the brothers were all arrested soon afterwards.

Capture and incarceration
During interrogation by police, Meekins was offered a plea agreement in return for turning state's evidence against the Brileys. He took the offer and provided a full detailing of the crime spree; as a result, he escaped the death penalty and was incarcerated under an alias at an out of state prison away from the Briley brothers. Under the agreement, Meekins was given a life sentence plus 80 years, which at the time of conviction would make him eligible for parole after serving 12-15 years.

A single life sentence with parole eligibility was handed down to Anthony Briley, youngest brother of the trio, due to his limited involvement in the killings. Because of Virginia's "triggerman statute", both James and Linwood received numerous life sentences for murders committed during the spree, but faced capital charges only in cases where they had physically committed the actual killing of the victim. Linwood was sentenced to death for the abduction and murder of Gallaher, while James received two death sentences, one for each of the murders of Judy Barton and her son Harvey. Both were sent to death row at Mecklenburg Correctional Center near Boydton in early 1980.

Escape
Linwood and James Briley were the ringleaders in a six-inmate escape from Virginia's death row at Mecklenburg Correctional Center on May 31, 1984. During the early moments of the escape, in which a coordinated effort resulted in inmates taking over the death row unit, both Brileys expressed strong interest in killing the captured guards by dousing them with rubbing alcohol and tossing a lit match. Willie Lloyd Turner, another death row inmate (convicted of murder; executed by lethal injection on May 25, 1995), stepped in James' way and blocked him from doing so. Meanwhile, Wilbert Lee Evans, on death row after being convicted of the murder of Alexandria City sheriff's deputy William Truesdale, prevented Linwood from raping a female nurse. Evans was executed on October 17, 1990, despite pleas for clemency and confirmation from the Mecklenburg guards who said they owed their lives to Evans. Alexandria Commonwealth's Attorney John Kloch opposed the clemency and Democratic Governor L. Douglas Wilder, the state's first African-American governor, ultimately denied clemency.

The group's initial plan was to escape into Canada. Two inmates, Lem Davis Tuggle Jr. (convicted of raping and murdering one woman shortly after being released for another such crime; executed by lethal injection on December 12, 1996) and Willie Leroy Jones (convicted of two capital murders; executed on September 11, 1992), almost succeeded, making it as far as Vermont before being captured at gunpoint by police. The group was held at Marble Valley Correctional Facility in Rutland, pending their extradition back to Virginia. Splitting off from their two remaining co-escapers at Philadelphia, the Brileys went to live near their uncle, Johnny Lee Council, in the north of the city. They were captured on June 19 by a heavily armed group of FBI agents and police, who had determined their location by placing wiretaps on their uncle's phone line.

Executions
In short order, the remaining appeals ran out for both brothers. Several weeks before his execution, James Briley married a writer who was convinced of his innocence claims, Evangeline Grant Redding, on March 28, 1985, in a prison ceremony attended by his father, James Sr. The brothers were executed in the electric chair at the Virginia State Penitentiary in Richmond; Linwood on October 12, 1984, and James on April 18, 1985. Linwood's last meal consisted of grilled tenderloin steak, a baked potato, green peas, a salad with French dressing, rolls with butter, cake, peaches, punch, and milk. His last words were "I am innocent." James's last meal consisted of fried shrimp with cocktail sauce and a lemon-lime-flavored soft drink. In his final moments, he smiled at the witnesses and twice asked them "Are you happy?"

Before James was executed, Shirley Barton Hayes, the mother of Judy Barton, pleaded for him to admit his guilt. She said she didn't believe in capital punishment, but asked him to confess "so his soul would be right with God."

The day James was executed, fellow inmates tried to delay the process by attacking the guards with homemade knives. Nine guards and one inmate were injured.

Linwood was survived by one son, Norman Laquan Ampy, who later served time in prison for bank robbery and died in 2015. James is survived by three daughters, who live in Richmond. The brothers are buried at the Council family's cemetery plot in Bethel, North Carolina.

Anthony Ray Briley was convicted of four counts of first degree murder, three of those for the Barton family murders. He received a life sentence plus 119 years, with the possibility of parole. Anthony avoided capital murder charges since it could not be proven that he had personally committed any of the murders. He is incarcerated at Augusta Correctional Center, about 20 miles outside Staunton, Virginia. To date, all his applications for parole have been denied by the state parole board, as have those of Duncan Meekins, despite recommendations from former prosecutors Robert J. Rice and Warren Von Schuch, who have cited Meekins' assistance in prosecuting and convicting the Briley brothers.

Victims
 January 28, 1971: Orline Christian, 57 (was shot and killed by Linwood alone)
 1979
 March 21: Michael McDuffie, 20
 March 31: Edric Alvin Clark, 28 (shot by Linwood over a drug dispute)
 April 9: Mary Gowen, 76
 July 4: Christopher Phillips, 17
 September 14: John Harvey "Johnny G." Gallaher, 62
 September 30: Mary Wilfong, 62
 October 5: The double killing
 Blanche Page, 75
 Charles Garner, 59
 October 19: The Wilkerson family
 Harvey Wilkerson, 27
 Judy Diane Barton, 23 (was 8 months pregnant)
 Harvey Wayne Barton, 5

See also
 Capital punishment in Virginia
 List of people executed in Virginia
 List of fugitives from justice who disappeared
 List of serial/spree killers in the United States
 List of prison escapes

References

External links
 
 
 

1971 murders in the United States
1979 murders in the United States
20th-century American criminals
American serial killers
American spree killers
Family murders
People from Richmond, Virginia
Quartets
Sibling trios
Year of birth missing